Second Line (alternatively titled Second Line: An Electro Revival) is the sixth studio album by American singer-songwriter Dawn Richard. It was released on April 30, 2021 through Merge Records. The title refers to the parade tradition of the same name practiced in Richard's hometown of New Orleans.

Reception 
Second Line received exceedingly excellent reviews from music critics, and holds a rating of 80 out of 100 on the review aggregator Metacritic.

Accolades

Track listing 
Second Line track listing

References 

2021 albums
Dawn Richard (singer) albums